The 2019 East Carolina Pirates football team represented East Carolina University in the 2019 NCAA Division I FBS football season. The Pirates, led by first-year head coach Mike Houston, played their home games at Dowdy-Ficklen Stadium, and were members of the East Division in the American Athletic Conference. They finished the season 4–8, 1–7 in AAC play to finish in fifth place in the East Division.

Previous season
The Pirates finished the 2018 season 3–9, 1–7 in AAC play to finish in fifth place in the East Division. On November 29, head coach Scottie Montgomery was fired. He finished at East Carolina with a three year record of 9–26. Defensive coordinator David Blackwell was the interim head coach during their final game of the season. On December 3, ECU hired James Madison head coach Mike Houston as their new head coach.

Preseason

AAC media poll
The AAC media poll was released on July 16, 2019, with the Pirates predicted to finish fifth in the AAC East Division.

Schedule

Schedule Source:

Personnel

Coaching staff

Game summaries

at NC State

Gardner–Webb

at Navy

William & Mary

at Old Dominion

Temple

at UCF

South Florida

Cincinnati

at SMU

at UConn

Tulsa

References

East Carolina
East Carolina Pirates football seasons
East Carolina Pirates football